Javier Lliso (born 18 August 1997) is a Spanish freestyle skier.

He competed in the men's big air and slopestyle competitions at the 2022 Winter Olympics in Beijing.

References

External links

1997 births
Living people
Spanish male freestyle skiers
Freestyle skiers at the 2022 Winter Olympics
Olympic freestyle skiers of Spain
Sportspeople from Madrid